Tetraspanin-12 (Tspan-12) also known as tetraspan NET-2 (NET2) or transmembrane 4 superfamily member 12 (TM4SF12) is a tetraspanin protein that in humans is encoded by the TSPAN12 gene. Tetraspanin-12 is found in the membrane of a variety of cells. It has an unusually long C-terminal intracellular tail of approximately 60 amino acids.

Function
Its main binding partner is the ADAM10 protein, a sheddase that interacts with a variety of adhesion molecules that are found on the cell membrane including L1-CAM, E-Cadherin, N-Cadherin and CD44. It also binds to the MT1-MMP metalloprotease protein that is closely related to ADAM10 but has a minimal effect on promotion of expression and function. TSPAN12 also seems to regulate vascular development, as shown by a study involving TSPAN12 knockout mice. TSPAN12 is a significant contributor to primary and metastatic cancer and is responsible for protecting β-catenin from degradation.

References

External links
 GeneReviews/NCBI/NIH/UW entry on Familial Exudative Vitreoretinopathy, Autosomal Dominant

Integral membrane proteins